Isodelphax is a genus of delphacid planthoppers in the family Delphacidae. There are at least 2 described species in Isodelphax.

Species
 Isodelphax basivitta (Van Duzee, 1909)
 Isodelphax nigridorsum

References

Further reading

External links

 

Auchenorrhyncha genera
Delphacinae